Kohfidisch (Burgenland Croatian: Zgornji Fideš) is a municipality in the district of Oberwart in the Austrian state of Burgenland.

Geography 
The municipality is composed of the main town Kohfidisch and the two villages Kirchfidisch and Harmisch.

Population

References

Cities and towns in Oberwart District